Stagecoach Merseyside & South Lancashire is a major operator of bus services in North West England. It is a subsidiary of the Stagecoach Group, and has its origins in the purchase of Ribble Motor Services in 1988 from the National Bus Company and Glenvale Transport in 2005. The head office of Stagecoach Merseyside & South Lancashire is in Liverpool and was formed in 2011 following the merger of Stagecoach Merseyside and Ribble Motor Services which was the Chorley and Preston operations of Stagecoach North West.

From January 2013, not long after Wigan takeover, Stagecoach Merseyside & South Lancashire also includes the Chester and Rock Ferry depots of First Chester & The Wirral following their takeover from FirstGroup.

From July 2016 Stagecoach Chester took over several former GHA Coaches routes after the firm went into Administration.

History

Stagecoach in Lancashire

Stagecoach is the trading name of Ribble Motor Services Ltd, which was purchased by Stagecoach in 1988 and was originally known as Stagecoach Ribble (until 1997), and operated services around the Central Lancashire area, serving Preston, Chorley, Bolton and Blackburn. The company also operated Network Chorley which provided transport around the local Chorley area until 2012.

In 2015, after Stagecoach re branded their Liverpool services as Stagecoach Merseyside, Stagecoach in Lancashire was re branded as Stagecoach in Chorley, Stagecoach in Preston and simply Stagecoach.

In September 2015, Stagecoach announced the purchase of 24 Alexander Dennis Enviro400 buses, in the 'Stagecoach Gold Specification' for the Route 125 between Bolton and Preston. The new vehicles will replace the old fleet of Dennis Trident 2s and Alexander Dennis Enviro 400s that the company inherited when it was formed.

Stagecoach closed the Eaves Lane depot in Chorley in October 2015, it was replaced by an outstation on an industrial estate on the outskirts of Chorley to house the modern fleet of Alexander Dennis Enviro400s operated. The other vehicles were transferred to Stagecoach in Preston.

In October 2015, Stagecoach took over John Fishwick & Sons services 111, 115 and 119 until 8 April 2016.

Stagecoach trail ran a Stagecoach Gold service on Route 125 on 17 October 2015, the full fleet entered service on 16 November 2015.

Stagecoach lost funding from Lancashire County Council in 2016 and consequently had to cancel and revise many routes in the Chorley area. The college services 109, 109A and 115 were withdrawn and have since been operated by Tyrers of Adlington.

Stagecoach in Chorley's business was heavily affected by Lancashire County Council funding cuts and many routes have been withdrawn.

Stagecoach shortened the Route 109A that ran to Preston from Chorley in December 2018, the route now terminates in Leyland.

In June 2019 Stagecoach announced that they were ceasing to operate the 109A service after losing funding from Lancashire County Council.

Following the removal of the service 109A Stagecoach begin running two new services, the 118 and 119 between Chorley, Collingwood Road and Astley Village.

Stagecoach in Merseyside

Stagecoach in Merseyside was the trading name of Glenvale Transport Ltd, which was purchased by Stagecoach in 2005. The original company was formed in 2001 following Arriva's takeover of MTL Group in 2000 and was ordered by the Competition Commission to sell the Gillmoss depot to avoid Arriva owning a monopoly of services in Merseyside. Stagecoach failed in an original attempt to obtain the depot in 2001, losing out to Glenvale Transport. Stagecoach bought Glenvale Transport in 2005 beating off competition from rivals FirstGroup, Go-Ahead Group and Transdev Blazefield.

Stagecoach Merseyside & South Lancashire
In August 2011, Stagecoach Group announced plans to re-structure their UK Bus operations in the North West of England with the former Stagecoach North West operations, which consisted of Stagecoach in Cumbria, Stagecoach in Lancashire and Stagecoach in Lancaster. The re-structuring saw Stagecoach North West split up into two halves, with Cumbria and Lancaster operations merging into Stagecoach Cumbria & North Lancashire and Stagecoach in Merseyside merging with Stagecoach in Lancashire. The other Stagecoach operation in the North West of England, Stagecoach Manchester, remained unaffected and continues as a separate operation.

Stagecoach in Chester and Wirral

In November 2012, Stagecoach Group announced they had agreed a deal to purchase the operations of First Chester & The Wirral from FirstGroup for £4.5 million. The deal included the two main depots in Chester and Rock Ferry, as well as a depot in Wrexham used for school services, plus 110 buses and 290 employees. The purchase was made through Stagecoach's Merseyside subsidiary, Glenvale Transport, bringing the Chester & Wirral operations under Stagecoach Merseyside. It was Stagecoach's second purchase from FirstGroup, following the purchase of First Greater Manchester's Wigan depot in October 2012.

The takeover was confirmed to be completed on 13 January 2013 with Stagecoach originally using ex-First buses and ticket machines before re-painting existing buses, bringing in old fleet vehicles from other areas and bringing in new buses and ticket machines.
All ex-first routes are now run by Stagecoach buses, carrying their own livery.

Depots
 Chester (Saighton Lane)
Chorley (Outstation. Moorland Gate)
 Liverpool (East Lancs Road, Gillmoss)
 Preston (Selbourne Street)
 Wirral (Rock Ferry)

References

External links
 Stagecoach UK Bus

Bus operators in Lancashire
Bus operators in Merseyside
Stagecoach Group bus operators in England
Transport companies established in 2011
2011 establishments in England